Raymond R. Suess Jr. (August 8, 1903 – August 11, 1970) was an American football player.

A native of St. Paul, Minnesota, Suess played professional football in the National Football League (NFL) as a guard, tackle, and end for the Duluth Eskimos during the 1926 and 1927 seasons. He appeared in a total of 16 NFL games, 13 as a starter. He died in 1970 at age 67 in Santa Ana, California.

References

1903 births
1970 deaths
People from Saint Paul, Minnesota
Duluth Eskimos players
Players of American football from Minnesota